The 1978-79 Turkish First Football League season saw 16 teams in competition. Trabzonspor won the championship.

League table

Results

References
Turkey - List of final tables (RSSSF)

Süper Lig seasons
1978–79 in Turkish football
Turkey